The Saint Louis Science Center, founded as a planetarium in 1963, is a collection of buildings including a science museum and planetarium in St. Louis, Missouri, on the southeastern corner of Forest Park.

James S. McDonnell Planetarium 

Funding for the first structure of the current campus began in 1955, with $1 million of a $110 million city bond issue specified for the construction of a planetarium. Two years were spent surveying locations. The first proposed site, on the northern side of Forest Park near the Jefferson Memorial Building at Lindell and DeBaliviere, was scrapped because of restrictions on subdivisions. The location was changed to the southern part of the park, on the site of the old mounted police station, which was demolished in 1960. The plan was to build a planetarium, science museum, and natural history museum.

The Planetarium was designed by Gyo Obata of Hellmuth, Obata and Kassabaum with a unique shape (Obata was later tasked in the 1970s with designing the Smithsonian's National Air and Space Museum in Washington, D.C.). Architectural Forum magazine described it as, "Looking like some strange craft spun down to earth from outer space... St. Louis's new planetarium perches gracefully on a rise in ... Forest Park". James Smith McDonnell (1899–1980), an aviation pioneer and co-founder of St. Louis-based McDonnell Douglas, an aerospace manufacturer, donated $200,000 for equipment such as the star projector. The facility was named after him in 1964.

The McDonnell Planetarium is home to a ZEISS UNIVERSARIUM Mark IX Star Projector. Installed in 2001, this machine is one of only three in the United States and thirteen in the world. The unusual request for an "open" planetarium theater called of the extremely bright stellar projections, a challenge outstandingly mastered by ZEISS fiber-optic projectors.

Science Center

In 1972, the Museum of Science and Natural History, located in Oak Knoll Park in the St. Louis suburb of Clayton, began to receive funds from sales tax through the Metropolitan Zoological Park and Museum District. In 1983, the museum purchased the Planetarium from the city, and closed it for remodeling. On July 20, 1978, the Planetarium reopened as the Saint Louis Science Center. On November 2, 1991, as part of a $34 million expansion, a new building opened across from the Planetarium south of I-64, on Oakland Avenue, increasing the size of the Science Center by a factor of seven. The new building was constructed on land that had previously been the site of the Falstaff Brewing Corporation headquarters. Connected to the Planetarium via a Skybridge over I-64, the new exhibits in the main building were devoted to Earth science, emerging technology, life sciences, physical science, and chemistry. Within two months, the newly remodeled St. Louis Science Center became the most visited science center in the world.

One of the most recognizable features of the St. Louis Science Center is the five-story domed OMNIMAX theater, which shows a variety of educational films and documentaries year round. Occasionally, the theater features feature films as they are released, such as Star Wars. In 2019, the OMNIMAX theater underwent its first major renovations since opening in 1991, becoming the fourth OMNIMAX theater to use the IMAX with laser projection system. Other improvements include new state-of-the-art sound technology, a NanoSeam screen for a more uniform screen surface, and upgraded and wider seating.

Exploradome and GROW 
On February 8, 1997, an air-supported building was added to the main building, the Exploradome. With an additional , it was intended as a temporary facility for traveling exhibitions, additional classrooms, and to host large group events.  Notable exhibits have included shows on the RMS Titanic ocean liner and Body Worlds, a traveling exhibition of preserved human bodies. From October 2011 until May 2012, the main building hosted Star Trek: The Exhibition, a major showcase of Star Trek props, costumes and artifacts, including a full-size bridge from the USS Enterprise. The Exploradome was deflated to make way for a planned expansion after 16 years of operations on June 24, 2013.

In 2016, the museum’s largest major addition in 25 years was completed. The new exhibit space was designed by St. Louis-based design firm Arcturis with Gyo Obata brought on as a consultant. Called GROW, the project’s centerpiece is a 5,000 square foot permanent pavilion that has a flexible, open floor plan that houses ever-changing exhibits and events. Its primary focus is the story of agriculture and the many ways technology is shaping the agricultural landscape.

Exhibitions

WeatherReadyFest 
The 2018 WeatherReadyFest event was held at the St. Louis Science Center featuring talks, demonstrations and displays from the National Weather Service and other government and private agencies.

Washington University in St. Louis CCSN Outreach 
Washington University students participating in the Cognitive, Computational and Systems Neuroscience (CCSN) pathway have created a series of exhibitions displayed at the St. Louis Science Center in an outreach program since the pathway's inception in 2008.

See also
 X Prize Foundation
 Erik Lindbergh

References

External links
 Saint Louis Science Center Homepage

Planetaria in the United States
IMAX venues
Hyperboloid structures
Museums in St. Louis
Science museums in Missouri
Science Cener
Science centers
Science center
1963 establishments in Missouri
Museums established in 1963
Buildings and structures in St. Louis
Natural history museums in Missouri